Majid Adibzadeh (born 1980) is an Iranian writer.

Research 

His books deal with topics such as "theories of democracy", "human sciences and universities in Iran", "The origins of modern rationality and modernity in Iran", "The modern state in Iran", "The historical conditions of Scientific thinking in Iran", "Modern Persian Literature and Iranian political culture" and "Iranian discourses and Political challenges Between Iran and the West".

Bibliography

References 

1980 births
Iranian critics
21st-century Iranian historians
Iranian Iranologists
Living people